Tim Stearns (born 1961 in Huntington, New York) is an American biologist and university administrator, and is the Dean of Graduate and Postgraduate Studies, Vice President of Education, and Head of Laboratory at The Rockefeller University.  Stearns was formerly the Frank Lee and Carol Hall Professor in the Department of Biology at Stanford University, with appointments in the Department of Genetics and the Cancer Center in the Stanford Medical School. Stearns served as chair of the Department of Biology at Stanford as well as Acting Dean of Research and Senior Associate Vice Provost of Research. Stearns is an HHMI Professor, and is a member of JASON, a scientific advisory group. He has served on the editorial boards of The Journal of Cell Biology, Genetics and Molecular Biology of the Cell.

Education

Stearns received his B.S. in genetics from Cornell University and did his undergraduate thesis work in the lab of Tom Fox on nuclear control of mitochondrial function in yeast. He received his Ph.D. in biology from the Massachusetts Institute of Technology. His Ph.D. advisor at MIT was David Botstein, and the title of his thesis was "Genetic analysis of the yeast microtubule cytoskeleton." Stearns' thesis identified exceptions to the genetic complementation test that were useful for defining genetic interactions and for the first time used the term "synthetic lethality" in the modern sense of two non-lethal mutations resulting in lethality in the double mutant. Stearns credits Botstein with instilling in him a commitment to teaching, and the belief that teaching and research go hand-in-hand.

Professional career

Stearns is known for his work on problems in cell biology and developmental biology, with a focus on the structure and function of the centrosome and cilium of eukaryotic cells. He was a Helen Hay Whitney postdoctoral fellow with Marc Kirschner at UCSF, where he published work on gamma-tubulin and in vitro reconstitution of the centrosome. Stearns has been a faculty member in the Department of Biology at Stanford since 1993. His major research accomplishments include the identification and characterization of new members of the tubulin superfamily of proteins, elucidation of mechanisms of centrosome duplication, and identification of properties of the primary cilium.

Stearns has also been active in undergraduate and graduate education, being named an HHMI Professor in 2002, and has chaired the Education committees of the American Society for Cell Biology and the Genetics Society of America. He created a pre-grad program at Stanford to train the next generation of leaders in biology research through close interaction with faculty members in course work, research and advising. Stearns taught the Yeast Genetics course at Cold Spring Harbor Laboratory, and has also taught laboratory workshops in South Africa, Chile, Ghana, and Tanzania.

Stearns is an advisor to the US government on science and technology matters. He was a member of the Defense Science Study Group, and is a current member of JASON, an independent scientific advisory group to the US that provides expertise on problems related to national security.

Personal life

Stearns and his wife reside in NYC. They previously lived near Stanford University and tended a fruit tree orchard originally planted by John Hensill, former dean of Natural Sciences at San Francisco State University, and a founder of the Redwood City Farmers Market.  Stearns is an accomplished musician, and student of American traditional music and early jazz.

References 

Stanford University Department of Biology faculty
Cornell University alumni
1961 births
Cell biologists
Stanford University faculty
Stanford University School of Medicine faculty
American molecular biologists
American geneticists
Members of JASON (advisory group)
Massachusetts Institute of Technology School of Science alumni
University of California, San Francisco alumni
Living people